Bubble coral may refer to two different species of sea anemone:

 Euphyllia baliensis, found off Bali, Indonesia
 Plerogyra sinuosa, found from the Red Sea to the west Pacific Ocean, from the East China Sea to the Line Islands